The 2007–08 Arkansas Razorbacks men's basketball team  represented the University of Arkansas in the 2007–08 college basketball season. It was John Pelphrey's first season as head coach of the Razorbacks, replacing the fired Stan Heath. The team played its home games in Bud Walton Arena in Fayetteville, Arkansas.

Roster

Schedule and results

|-
!colspan=12 style="background:#; color:#FFFFFF;"| Exhibition

|-
!colspan=12 style="background:#; color:#FFFFFF;"| Regular season

|-
!colspan=12 style="background:#;"| SEC tournament

|-
!colspan=12 style="background:#;"| NCAA tournament

References

 
 
 

Arkansas Razorbacks
Arkansas
Arkansas Razorbacks men's basketball seasons